Hampton Coliseum is a multi-purpose arena in Hampton, Virginia. Construction began on May 24, 1968. The venue held its first event on December 1, 1969, with the nearby College of William & Mary playing North Carolina State University in a college men's basketball game. On January 31, 1970, the Coliseum formally opened as the first large multi-purpose arena in the Hampton Roads region and the state of Virginia (opening a year before the Norfolk Scope in Norfolk.)

With a final estimated cost between $8.5 million to $9 million, the arena was designed by Odell Associates and constructed by McDevitt and Street, of Charlotte, North Carolina. The venue capacity is configurable from 9,800 to 13,800 seats.

Sport
Hampton Coliseum was one of several former homes of the American Basketball Association Virginia Squires professional basketball franchise. The coliseum was also home to the Virginia Wings in the American Hockey League and Hampton Gulls in the Southern Hockey League and the Hampton Aces of the North Eastern Hockey League and Eastern Hockey League.

The coliseum hosted the Division I men's college basketball ECAC South Region tournament, organized by the Eastern College Athletic Conference (ECAC), in 1980 and 1981. The 1985 Sun Belt Conference Men's Basketball Tournament and the 1987, 1988, and 1989 Colonial Athletic Association Men's Basketball Tournaments were held in the coliseum. The Old Dominion Monarchs basketball team played occasional games in the coliseum from 1970 to 1995, usually one game a year, although twice the team played several games in the coliseum, in the 1979–80 and 1984-85 seasons. The Hampton Coliseum is the home of the Virginia Duals annual wrestling tournament, hosting invitational college and high school matches.

The National Wrestling Alliance, WCW, WWE and other wrestling promotions have run shows at the Coliseum since the 1980s.

Music 
The Grateful Dead performed 21 concerts at Hampton Coliseum between 1979 and 1992, including their now-famous 1989 shows at the venue. The shows were later commercially released as Formerly the Warlocks because the band was billed under the name The Warlocks.

Elvis Presley performed 2 shows at the Coliseum in April 1972, another show in March of 1974, and another 2 shows in August of 1976. All shows were sold out.

Madonna brought The Virgin Tour to the Coliseum on May 30, 1985.

Metallica performed at the Hampton Coliseum in 1986.

The venue remains popular with the rock band Phish, whose multi-night stand in 1998 was released as Hampton Comes Alive as well as choosing Hampton Coliseum as the site of their 2009 reunion shows. The band has performed at the venue 21 times between 1995 and the end of 2018.

The world's first pay-per-view live broadcast of a rock show was held at the venue on December 18, 1981, when The Rolling Stones American Tour 1981 ended with a two-night stint. Guitarist Keith Richards memorably hit a man who ran onstage with his guitar.

Other performers include: The Who, Bon Jovi, Led Zeppelin, Van Halen, Pink Floyd, Bassnectar, U2, Marvin Gaye, The Jacksons, Parliament-Funkadelic, Tina Turner, Bruce Springsteen, R.E.M., Dave Matthews Band, String Cheese Incident, Widespread Panic, Jerry Garcia Band, Pearl Jam, Griz, KISS, and Grateful Dead offshoots Furthur and The Other Ones.

Notable recordings 
The popularity of Hampton Coliseum among performers has led to the release of many notable live albums and tracks that were recorded at the venue. 
 Rolling Stones – Hampton Coliseum 1981
 James Taylor – Live
 Phish – Hampton Comes Alive
 Phish – Hampton / Winston Salem '97
 Grateful Dead – Live at Hampton Coliseum
 Grateful Dead – Formerly the Warlocks
 Jerry Garcia Band -Pure Jerry: Coliseum, Hampton, VA, November 9, 1991
 Metallica – Master of Puppets Remastered Deluxe Box Set / Disc 7 1986
 Led Zeppelin – Hampton Roads Coliseum 1971
 Elvis Presley – The Hampton Roads Concert
 Neil Diamond – Stages - Marry Me Live '96  (Disc 4/Track 16)
 Dave Matthews Band - Live Trax, Vol 7: Hampton Coliseum 12.31.96

References

External links 
 

College basketball venues in the United States
Buildings and structures in Hampton, Virginia
Indoor arenas in Virginia
Sports venues in Hampton Roads
Basketball venues in Virginia
American Basketball Association venues
Old Dominion Monarchs basketball
1969 establishments in Virginia
Sports venues completed in 1969